The 2007–08 Texas Longhorns men's basketball team represented The University of Texas at Austin in NCAA Division I intercollegiate men's basketball competition as a member of the Big 12 Conference. The 2007–08 team shared the Big 12 championship, won a school-record 31 games, and reached the Elite Eight of the 2008 NCAA tournament.

Roster

Recruiting

Schedule 

|-
| colspan="9" style="text-align:center;" | Exhibition Games
|-style="background: #ddffdd;"
| Fri, Nov 2 || 7 p.m. || Xavier (La.) || #15 || Frank Erwin Center • Austin, Texas || || W 87–56 || || (1–0 exhib.)
|-
| colspan="8" style="text-align:center;" | Regular Season
|-style="background: #ddffdd;"
| Mon, Nov 12 || 7 p.m. || Texas-San Antonio || #16 || Frank Erwin Center • Austin, Texas || FSNSW(Texas) ||  W 58–37 || 10840 || 1–0
|-style="background: #ddffdd;"
| Fri, Nov 16 || 7 p.m. || UC Davis || #16 || Frank Erwin Center • Austin, Texas(StubHub! Legends Classic Regional Round) || || W 73–42 || 10792 || 2–0
|-style="background: #ddffdd;"
| Sun, Nov 18 || 5 p.m. || Arkansas-Monticello || #16 || Frank Erwin Center • Austin, Texas(StubHub! Legends Classic Regional Round) || || W 100–52 || 10483 || 3–0
|-style="background: #ddffdd;"
| Fri, Nov 23 || 6 p.m. || vs. New Mexico State || #15 || Prudential Center • Newark, New Jersey(StubHub! Legends Classic Semifinals) || Versus ||  W 102–87 || || 4–0
|-style="background: #ddffdd;"
| Sat, Nov 24 || 6 p.m. || vs. #7 Tennessee || #15 || Prudential Center • Newark, New Jersey(StubHub! Legends Classic Championship Game) || FSNSW(Texas)/Versus ||  W 97–78 |||| 5–0
|-style="background: #ddffdd;"
| Wed, Nov 28 || 7 p.m. || Texas Southern || #8 || Frank Erwin Center • Austin, Texas || || W 98–61 || 10518 || 6–0
|-style="background: #ddffdd;"
| Sun, Dec 2 || 7 p.m. || @ #2 UCLA || #8 || Pauley Pavilion • Los Angeles, California(Big 12/Pac-10 Hardwood Series) || Fox Sports Net || W 63–61 || 12048 || 7–0
|-style="background: #ddffdd;"
| Wed, Dec 5 || 7 p.m. || North Texas || #4 || Frank Erwin Center • Austin, Texas || FSNSW (Texas) || W 88–72 || 10913|| 8–0
|-style="background: #ddffdd;"
| Sat, Dec 8 || 7 p.m. || @ Rice || #4 || Toyota Center • Houston, Texas || CSTV || W 80–54 || || 9–0
|-style="background: #ddffdd;"
| Sat, Dec 15 || 5 p.m. || Texas State || #4 || Frank Erwin Center • Austin, Texas || FSNSW (Texas) || W 96–81 || 12863|| 10–0
|-style="background: #ddffdd;"
| Tue, Dec 18 || 5:30 p.m. || Oral Roberts || #4 || Frank Erwin Center • Austin, Texas || FSNSW (Texas) || W 66–56 ||11540 || 11–0
|-style="background: #ffdddd;"
| Sat, Dec 22 || 5:30 p.m. || vs. #9 Michigan State || #4 || The Palace of Auburn Hills • Auburn Hills, Michigan(Dick’s Sporting Goods Spartan Clash) || ESPN || L 72–78 || || 11–1
|-style="background: #ffdddd;"
| Sat, Dec 29 || 11 a.m. || Wisconsin || #9 || Frank Erwin Center • Austin, Texas || ESPN2 || L 66–67 || 16438|| 11–2
|-style="background: #ddffdd;"
| Wed, Jan 2 || 4 p.m. || TCU || #14 || Frank Erwin Center • Austin, Texas || FSNSW (Texas) || W 67–59 || 12157|| 12–2
|-style="background: #ddffdd;"
| Sat, Jan 5 || 5 p.m. || St. Mary's (Calif.) || #14 || Frank Erwin Center • Austin, Texas || FSNSW (Texas) || W 81–62 || 12525|| 13–2
|-style="background: #ffdddd;"
| Sat, Jan 12 || 12:45 p.m. || @ Missouri* || #12 || Mizzou Arena • Columbia, Missouri || ESPN Plus || L 84–97 || || 13–3(0–1 Big 12)
|-style="background: #ddffdd;"
| Sat, Jan 19 || 7 p.m. || Colorado* || #19 || Frank Erwin Center • Austin, Texas || ESPN Plus || W 69–67 || 16755|| 14–3 (1–1)
|-style="background: #ddffdd;"
| Mon, Jan 21 || 8 p.m. || @ Oklahoma State* || #12 || Gallagher-Iba Arena • Stillwater, Oklahoma || ESPN || W 63–61 || || 15–3 (2–1)
|-style="background: #ddffdd;"
| Sat, Jan 26 || 7 p.m. || Texas Tech* || #12 || Frank Erwin Center • Austin, Texas || ESPN Plus || W 73–47 || 16755|| 16–3 (3–1)
|-style="background: #ffdddd;"
| Wed, Jan 30 || 8 p.m. || @ #23 Texas A&M* || #10 || Reed Arena • College Station, Texas || ESPN2 || L 63–80 || || 16–4 (3–2)
|-style="background: #ddffdd;"
| Sat, Feb 2 || 12:45 p.m. || #25 Baylor* || #10 || Frank Erwin Center • Austin, Texas || ESPN Plus || W 80–72 || 15458|| 17–4 (4–2)
|-style="background: #ddffdd;"
| Wed, Feb 6 || 6 p.m. || @ Oklahoma* || #12 || Lloyd Noble Center • Norman, Oklahoma || ESPN2 || W 64–54 || || 18–4 (5–2)
|-style="background: #ddffdd;"
| Sat, Feb 9 || 2:30 p.m. || @ Iowa State* || #12 || Hilton Coliseum • Ames, Iowa || ABC || W 71–65 OT || || 19–4 (6–2)
|-style="background: #ddffdd;"
| Mon, Feb 11 || 8 p.m. || #3 Kansas* || #11 || Frank Erwin Center • Austin, Texas || ESPN || W 72–69 || 16755|| 20–4 (7–2)
|-style="background: #ddffdd;"
| Sat, Feb 16 || 5 p.m. || @ Baylor* || #11 || Ferrell Center • Waco, Texas || ESPN || W 82–77 || || 21–4 (8–2)
|-style="background: #ddffdd;"
| Mon, Feb 18 || 8 p.m. || #22 Texas A&M* || #7 || Frank Erwin Center • Austin, Texas || ESPN || W 77–50 || 16755|| 22–4 (9–2)
|-style="background: #ddffdd;"
| Sat, Feb 23 || 2:30 p.m. || Oklahoma* || #7 || Frank Erwin Center • Austin, Texas || ABC || W 62–45 || 16056|| 23–4 (10–2)
|-style="background: #ddffdd;"
| Mon, Feb 25 || 8 p.m. || @ Kansas State* || #5 || Bramlage Coliseum • Manhattan, Kansas || ESPN || W 74–65 || || 24–4 (11–2)
|-style="background: #ffdddd;"
| Sat, Mar 1 || 3 p.m. || @ Texas Tech* || #5 || United Spirit Arena • Lubbock, Texas || CBS || L 80–83 || || 24–5 (11–3)
|-style="background: #ddffdd;"
| Tue, Mar 4 || 6:30 p.m. || Nebraska* || #9 || Frank Erwin Center • Austin, Texas || FSNSW (Texas) || W 70–66 || 14565 || 25–5 (12–3)
|-style="background: #ddffdd;"
| Sun, Mar 9 || 3 p.m. || Oklahoma State* || #9 || Frank Erwin Center • Austin, Texas || ESPN || W 62–57 || 16505 || 26–5 (13–3)
|-
| colspan="9" style="text-align:center;" | 2008 Big 12 Conference tournament — No. 1 Seed
|-style="background: #ddffdd;"
| Fri, Mar 14 || 11:30 a.m.|| vs. (9) Oklahoma State* || #6 || Sprint Center • Kansas City, Missouri(Big 12 Conference tournament quarterfinals) || ESPN Plus/ESPNU || W 66–59 || || 27–5
|-style="background: #ddffdd;"
| Sat, Mar 15 || 1 p.m. || vs. (4) Oklahoma* || #6 || Sprint Center • Kansas City, Missouri(Big 12 Conference tournament semifinals) || ESPN Plus/ESPN2 || W 77–49 || ||28–5
|-style="background: #ffdddd;"
| Sun, Mar 16 || 2 p.m. || vs. (2) #5 Kansas* || #6 || Sprint Center • Kansas City, Missouri || ESPN || L 74–84 || ||28–6
|-
| colspan="9" style="text-align:center;" | 2008 NCAA tournament — No. 2 Seed
|-style="background: #ddffdd;"
| Fri, Mar 21 || 2 p.m. || vs. (15) Austin Peay || #7 || Alltel Arena • Little Rock, Arkansas First Round || CBS || W 74–54 || || 29–6
|-style="background: #ddffdd;"
| Sun, Mar 23 || 1:15 p.m. || vs. (7) Miami (FL) || #7 || Alltel Arena • Little Rock, Arkansas Second Round || CBS || W 75–72 || || 30–6
|-style="background: #ddffdd;"
| Fri, Mar 28 || 6:27 p.m.  || vs. (3) #10 Stanford || #7 || Reliant Stadium • Houston, Texas Sweet Sixteen || CBS || W 82–62 || || 31–6
|-style="background: #ffdddd;"
| Sun, Mar 30 || 1:20 p.m. || vs. (1) #2 Memphis || #7 || Reliant Stadium • Houston, Texas Elite Eight || CBS || L 67–85 || || 31–7
|-style="background: #wwwwww;"
| colspan="9" | *Big 12 Conference Game. †All times in Central Standard Time. #Rank according to Associated Press (AP) Poll. OT indicates overtime.
|}

References 

Texas Longhorns men's basketball seasons
Texas
Texas
2007 in sports in Texas
2008 in sports in Texas